Judith: A Parting from the Body is a play by British playwright Howard Barker. It premiered in 1992, with British actress Melanie Jessop in the title role, in a production by The Wrestling School. The play has since seen revivals on London's fringe theatre circuit, including productions at the Cock Tavern Theatre directed by Robyn Winfield-Smith,  and at the Rosemary Branch Theatre directed by Teunkie Van Der Sluijs.

Synopsis
Judith: A Parting from the Body is a retelling of the Apocryphal story of female heroism in the form of the Jewish Judith challenging and killing general Holofernes. In Howard Barker's retelling of the story, Judith discovers she holds strong feelings for Holofernes, and the ambiguity of her sacrifice is investigated.

Critical reception
The British newspaper The Independent wrote of the original production that it was "..impeccably acted...visually gorgeous as it is profound......"

References

British plays
1992 plays
Cultural depictions of Judith